Tooradin is a town in Victoria, Australia, 57 km south east of Melbourne's Central Business District, located within the City of Casey and the Shire of Cardinia local government areas.

Naming

The name of Tooradin comes from the Boon wurrung word too-roo-dun, which refers to the Bunyip that lived in the Koo-Wee-Rup Swamp. The Dreamtime creature had a 'reputation for devouring human beings' and 'lived in the thick mud beneath the water of a waterhole that never dried up.'

History

Tooradin was originally settled by the Western Port Indigenous people called the Boon wurrung. They had their traditional lands for many thousands of years.

The explorer William Hovell visited the area in 1827, he saw evidence of Van Diemens Land sealers had left at their temporary camps on the foreshore of Western Port Bay. The sealers had been operating since the early 1800s.

In 1839 saw settlers with their cattle establish runs and settle in the area. Work commenced at draining swamps and improving drainage for pasture. The township was first surveyed in 1854.

Tooradin has always been a fishing village that nestled on the foreshore. The Post Office opened on 21 May 1877.

The railway passed by north of the town by 2 1/2 miles in 1885. A station was created and the fishing industry relied heavily on the railway to transport freshly caught fish to Melbourne. The railways also transported local produce, cattle, sheep and crops were raised on the land and sent to market.

Today

The town has some attractions such as Sawtell's Inlet, and an old historic weatherboard Fishermans Cottage. It is a popular stopping place for people travelling to Phillip Island.

The town in conjunction with neighbouring township Dalmore has an Australian Rules football team (Tooradin-Dalmore) competing in the West Gippsland Football Netball Competition.

Transport

Tooradin railway station was formerly situated on the South Gippsland railway corridor that operated to its terminus at Yarram in the early 1980s and Leongatha in the mid 1990s. A V/Line road coach service replaced the rail service to Leongatha on July 24, 1993, running between Melbourne and Yarram. However, since the closure of the South Gippsland rail line—with the exception of the locally run tourist railway between Nyora and Leongatha (this section of line closed in 2015) by the Kennett Victorian government on December 14, 1994, the South and West Gippsland Transport Group represented by the local council are campaigning for the rail services to be reinstated beyond the current terminus at Cranbourne by the 2020s, which was promised by Bracks government in 1999.

Tooradin Airfield
Tooradin Airfield is a privately owned field located 4 km (2.5 miles) East of Tooradin town centre, on the South Gippsland Highway.

There's a derelict freighter ship behind the runway, can be seen on the Gippsland highway, the ship is the Edwina May.

See also
 City of Cranbourne – Tooradin was previously within this former local government area.
 Tooradin railway station

References

External links
 www.tooradinvillage.com.au

Western Port
Towns in Victoria (Australia)
Coastal towns in Victoria (Australia)
City of Casey
Shire of Cardinia